Delgosha (also Romanized as Delgoshā) is a city in and capital of Gachi District, in Malekshahi County, Ilam Province, Iran. At the 2006 census, its population was 3,931, in 676 families. It is adjacent to the city of Arakvaz, bordering it to the south. The city is populated by Kurds.

References

Populated places in Malekshahi County

Cities in Ilam Province
Kurdish settlements in Ilam Province